The Flying Leatherneck Aviation Museum is a United States Marine Corps aviation museum currently located at Marine Corps Air Station Miramar, San Diego, California. The museum contains exhibits and artifacts relating to the history and legacy of United States Marine Corps Aviation. The outdoor exhibits include 31 historical aircraft, multiple military vehicles and equipment. Indoor exhibits feature photographs, artifacts and artwork from the early days of aviation to the present.

History
The El Toro Historical Center and Command Museum opened to the public in June 1991 in a squadron aviation building at Marine Corps Air Station El Toro. By 1998, the name of the museum had changed to the Jay W. Hubbard Command Museum.

Move to Miramar
When MCAS El Toro closed in 1999, the museum again changed its name to the Flying Leatherneck Aviation Museum and moved to Naval Air Station Miramar. The museum's 41 aircraft were loaded onto trailers and towed down highways to the museum's new location, where it reopened on 25 May 2000. There it had a  restoration hangar. In 2002, the museum announced plans to construct a  building to display its collection. At the same time, however, increased security on the base after the September 11th attacks made it more difficult for civilians to visit.

Separately, plans for a museum at El Toro began in 2008.

Return to El Toro
In 2021, the Marine Corps announced that it would be permanently closing the Flying Leatherneck Aviation Museum and transferring the aircraft to other museums. Subsequently, museum supporters began a campaign to move the museum to a new location.

The Flying Leatherneck Historical Foundation began discussions with the City of Irvine about a possible relocation of the museum back to the former Marine Corps Air Station El Toro. The museum would become part of a planned Cultural Terrace at the former air station, now renamed Orange County Great Park. In December, the museum announced that an agreement had been reached to move the aircraft to the abandoned Marine Aircraft Group 46 hangars in 2023. By March of the following year, aircraft on loan from the National Naval Aviation Museum were being disassembled in preparation for moves to other museums. Plans are currently underway to move the rest of the 40+ aircraft to the new location in Hangar 296 in Great Park, Irvine, California.

Collection

Aircraft on display

 Beechcraft T-34B Mentor 140688
 Bell AH-1J Sea Cobra 157784
 Bell 214ST 28166
 Bell UH-1L Iroquois 157824
 Boeing Vertol CH-46E Sea Knight 154803
 Douglas A-4C Skyhawk 148492
 Douglas A-4F Skyhawk 154204
 Douglas A-4M Skyhawk II 160264
 Douglas TA-4J Skyhawk 158467
 Douglas F3D-2 Skyknight 124630
 Douglas F4D-1 Skyray 139177
 General Motors TBM-3E Avenger 53726
 Grumman A-6E Intruder 154170
 Grumman F9F-2 Panther 123652
 Grumman F9F-8P Cougar 141722
 Hawker Siddeley AV-8C Harrier 158387
 McDonnell F2H-2 Banshee 124988
 McDonnell Douglas F/A-18A Hornet 161749
 McDonnell Douglas F/A-18A Hornet 163152
 McDonnell Douglas F-4S Phantom II 157246
 McDonnell Douglas RF-4B Phantom II 151981
 Mikoyan-Gurevich MiG-15 81072
 North American SNJ-5 Texan 90866
 Northrop F-5E Tiger II 741564
 Northrop Grumman EA-6B Prowler 161882
 North American Rockwell OV-10D Bronco 155494
 Sikorsky CH-53A Sea Stallion 153304
 Sikorsky HRS-3 Chickasaw 130252
 Sikorsky HUS Seahorse 150219
 Vought F8U-2NE Crusader 150920
 Vought RF-8G Crusader 144617

Other exhibits

 AAI RQ-2B Pioneer – This aircraft is mounted to the M927 Truck on display.
 BMP-1 – This vehicle was captured from the Iraqi Army during Desert Storm.
 D-20 – This vehicle was captured from the Iraqi Army during Desert Storm.
 MT-LB – This vehicle was captured from the Iraqi Army during Desert Storm.
 Landing Signals Officer (LSO) Shack
 M1097 Avenger
 M927 Truck

In storage

 Bell HTL Sioux 64-15338
 Bell UH-1N Twin Huey 159198
 Stinson OY-1 Sentinel 42-14918
 Douglas A-4B Skyhawk 142879
 Douglas SBD-1 Dauntless 1612 – Under restoration
 Ford M151A2
 Kaman HOK-1 Huskie 139990
 Lockheed TO-1 33840
 North American PBJ-1J Mitchell 44-86727 – Under restoration
 Piasecki HUP-2 Retriever 128596 – Under restoration
 Vought RF-8G Crusader 146858
 General Motors FM-2 Wildcat 16278

MCAS Miramar Post Exchange
The following items, being located away from the museum complex, are available only to visitors who have access to the post exchange.

 Douglas R4D-8 Skytrain 50835
 Douglas R5D Skymaster 90392
 Fairchild R4Q Packet 131708

See also
Marine Corps Museums
United States Marine Corps Aviation
Naval Aviation Hall of Honor (including USMC)
United States naval aviator

References

Footnotes

Notes

Bibliography

External links

Official website
Marine Corps Air Station Miramar

Aerospace museums in California
Marine Corps museums in the United States
Military and war museums in California
Museums in San Diego
United States Marine Corps aviation
United States Marine Corps pilots of World War II